Ciipher is a South Korean boy band created by South Korean singer Rain under R.A.I.N. Company. The group consists of Tan, Hwi, Hyunbin, Keita, Tag, Dohwan and Won. The group debuted on March 15, 2021, with the extended play (EP) I Like You.

History

Pre-debut
Preparation for the debut of the group has been three years in the making. About selecting the members for the first group signed under his R.A.I.N company, Rain said, "There were a lot of factors involved in the process of making Ciipher, but when I met these kids, I felt like I could bet it all on them. Not just my time or my skill, but all the things I had and have made. Whether the group has good results or not, I don't think I'll regret the things that I gave to this group. That's how talented and well-mannered they are".

Prior to joining the group, many of the members had auditioned on popular television programs or trained at other major labels. In December 2014, Tan competed in Mnet's survival reality show, No.Mercy under his birth name Choi Seok-won. However, he did not make it into the final lineup of the boy group, Monsta X in 2015. Keita and Dohwan were former contestants on YG's Treasure Box, but they both did not make it into the show's final debut lineup. Won was a contestant on Under Nineteen under his birth name Park Sung-won. He became a member of the debut lineup as he finished in 7th place. Won debuted as a member of 1the9 on April 13, 2019, and the group officially disbanded as a group on August 8, 2020. Hyunbin was a former contestant on Produce X 101 under Starship Entertainment, and was eliminated on episode 8, finishing in 32nd place.

2021: Debut with I Like You and Blind
On December 12, 2020, Rain announced Ciipher would debut with their first extended play I Like You on March 15, 2021.

On September 28, 2021, Ciipher released their second extended play Blind.

2022–present: The Code and Boys Planet
On May 11, 2022, Ciipher released their third extended play The Code.

Keita and Tag are contestants on Boys Planet. Tag left before the show began.

Members
Adapted from their Naver profile and website profile.

Active
 Tan (탄)
 Hwi (휘)
 Tag (태그)
 Dohwan (도환)
 Won (원)

Inactive
 Hyunbin (현빈) – leader (inactive due to Fantasy Boys participation)
 Keita (케이타) (inactive due to Boys Planet participation)

Discography

Extended plays

Singles

Videography

Music videos

Awards and nominations

Notes

References

External links
  

2021 establishments in South Korea
Musical groups from Seoul
K-pop music groups
Musical groups established in 2021
South Korean dance music groups
South Korean boy bands